Salme Rootare (March 26, 1913, Tallinn – October 21, 1987) was an Estonian chess master.

She was fifteen times Estonian Champion (1945, 1948, 1949, 1950, 1954, 1956, 1957, 1960, 1962, 1964, 1966, 1969, 1970, 1971, and 1972).

Salme tied for 4-5th at Plovdiv 1959 (Candidates Tournament, Women's World Chess Championship). She beat Ludmilla Rudenko, the all-USSR women's champ 1950-1953, at least once, in 1956 in recorded tournament play, when Rudenko, believing she was would be mated on her next move, resigned. It wasn't until later that both players realised that Rudenko had a saving move.

She received the FIDE title of Woman International Master (WIM) in 1957.

Salme was married to Vidrik Rootare, known as Frits, and they had a daughter, Reet.

References 

1913 births
1987 deaths
Sportspeople from Tallinn
People from the Governorate of Estonia
Estonian female chess players
Soviet female chess players
Chess Woman International Masters
Soviet chess players